This is a list of fossiliferous stratigraphic units in Manitoba, Canada.

References

 

Manitoba
Geology of Manitoba